Eugene Sumner Mills (September 13, 1924 – August 18, 2020) was an American academic. He was the thirteenth President of the University of New Hampshire from 1974 to 1979. Mills attended Earlham College and Claremont Graduate University, earning a Ph.D. in psychology at the latter. He taught at Whittier College before coming to the University of New Hampshire. Mills was a member of the UNH faculty for 17 years starting in 1962 as professor and chairman for the Department of Psychology, finishing up with his presidency.  Mills then went on to serve as the president of Whittier College from 1979 to 1989, and interim president of Earlham College from 1996 to 1997.

He died in August 2020 at the age of 95 in Durham, New Hampshire.

The University of New Hampshire built a residence hall named Mills Hall in his honor, it was dedicated on November 7, 2002.

Mills was an early board member of Elderhostel,  which became the Road Scholar program,  a travel based education program.

Selected works 
The Story of Elderhostel

References

External links
University of New Hampshire: Office of the President
Full list of University Presidents (including interim Presidents) , University of New Hampshire Library
Whittier College Past Presidents
Passings: Eugene Mills, Former UNH President, UNH today
In Memoriam: Bright shall thy mem’ry be UNH magazine, fall-2020

1924 births
2020 deaths
Claremont Graduate University alumni
Earlham College alumni
Presidents of the University of New Hampshire
Presidents of Whittier College
University of New Hampshire faculty